Gustave Henri Lauvaux (25 November 1892 – 8 April 1970) was a French runner. He competed at the 1920 Summer Olympics in the individual and team cross-country events and finished in 17th and 5th place, respectively. His younger  brother Henri Lauvaux competed in the same events at the 1924 Olympics.

References

1892 births
1970 deaths
French male middle-distance runners
Olympic athletes of France
Athletes (track and field) at the 1920 Summer Olympics
Olympic cross country runners
People from Châlons-en-Champagne
Sportspeople from Marne (department)